Timeless Journey is the fifteenth studio album by American singer Patti LaBelle. Her first release with Def Soul Classics (an R&B magnet of Def Jam Recordings), it was released on May 4, 2004 in the United States. One of her most commercially successful albums, it reached number five on the US Billboard Top R&B/Hip-Hop Albums, also hitting the top 20 on the Billboard 200. Timeless Journey produced the singles "New Day" and "2 Steps Away".

Background
By 2002, Patti LaBelle had been with MCA Records for seventeen years. The label had helped to increase LaBelle's popularity with both pop and R&B audiences resulting in 2 platinum album and four subsequent gold-selling follow-ups. However, LaBelle's last album with the label, 2000's solemnly-produced When a Woman Loves failed to generate a hit record or even go gold. In 2003, MCA Records was absorbed by Geffen Records. As a result, LaBelle signed with The Island Def Jam Music Group's Def Soul Classics division, joining The Isley Brothers as the two first acts on Antonio "L.A." Reid's new Def Jam imprint. LaBelle went to work on her new album in 2003 and by 2004, LaBelle and Def Jam released Timeless Journey. By the end of the year the album went gold with sales shipping past the 500,000 mark.

Release
Fueled by the release of LaBelle's first hit single in seven years, "New Day", the album eventually did well on the pop and R&B charts reaching number 18 on the former and number 5 on the latter. However, LaBelle and Def Jam fell into problems immediately after its release. Shortly after releasing 2005's Classic Moments, LaBelle told reporters that she was "unceremoniously" kicked out of the label by Reid. After a public spat, Reid renegotiated a new contract with LaBelle in 2007 releasing a Christmas album. Though the album did go gold, it did receive some popularity. Five years later, the ballad "2 Steps Away", written by Philadelphia songwriter and friend Jon DeLise, was featured on Dancing with the Stars. Two Steps Away also aired multiple times on "So you think you can dance" among other network shows and was re-released on the Care for Haiti compilation with notable artists such as Wycleaf Jean and Natasha Beddingfield. The success of the song eventually helped it reach Billboard's Digital Singles chart, her first charted single on that chart. "New Day" topped the Billboard Hot Dance Songs chart in 2004.

Track listing

Charts

Weekly charts

Year-end charts

References

2004 albums
Def Jam Recordings albums
Patti LaBelle albums
Albums produced by Babyface (musician)